Cameron James Rising (born May 13, 1999) is an American football quarterback for the Utah Utes. He was the First-Team All-Pac-12 quarterback in 2021.

High school career
Rising attended Newbury Park High School in Newbury Park, California. He committed to the University of Texas at Austin to play college football.

College career
Rising redshirted his only year at Texas in 2018. He transferred to the University of Utah in 2019. After redshirting his first year at Utah, Rising competed with Jake Bentley for the starting job in 2020. Although Bentley won the job, Rising was chosen to start against the USC Trojans. During the game, he completed three of six passes for 45 yards with an interception before suffering a shoulder injury which caused him to the miss the rest of the season. Rising returned from the injury to compete with Charlie Brewer for the starting job in 2021. Rising again lost the starting quarterback position, but replaced Brewer after two games and started the final 11 games of the season. Overall, he completed 204 of 320 passes for 2,493 yards, 20 touchdowns and five interceptions.

Statistics

References

External links
Utah Utes bio

Living people
Players of American football from California
American football quarterbacks
Texas Longhorns football players
Utah Utes football players
1999 births